Girish Park is a station of the Kolkata Metro line 1, close to Girish Park in Jorasanko.

History

Construction

Station

Structure
Girish Park is underground metro station, situated on the Kolkata Metro Line 1 of Kolkata Metro.

Station layout

Connections

Bus
Bus route number 3B, 30C, 43, 47B, 78, 214, 214A, 215/1, 215A/1, 219/1, 222, 237, L238, 242, 13 (Mini), 13A (Mini), 20 (Mini), 20A (Mini), 29 (Mini), S139 (Mini), S151 (Mini), S152 (Mini), S159 (Mini), S160 (Mini), S161 (Mini), S163 (Mini), S164 (Mini), S172 (Mini), S175 (Mini), S181 (Mini), S184 (Mini), C28, E25, E32, S9A, S10, S11, S15G, S17A, S32, S32A, S57, AC2, AC10, AC20, AC39, AC40, AC54, VS1, VS2 etc. serve the station.

Entry/Exit

Gallery

See also

Kolkata
List of Kolkata Metro stations
Transport in Kolkata
Kolkata Metro Rail Corporation
Kolkata Suburban Railway
Kolkata Monorail
Trams in Kolkata
Chittaranjan Avenue
Maniktala
List of rapid transit systems
List of metro systems

References

External links
 

Kolkata Metro stations
Railway stations in Kolkata
Railway stations opened in 1984